Michael Ronaldo Mboe Ntube (born 4 February 2001) is an Italian footballer who plays as a defender for Serie C club AlbinoLeffe.

Club career

Inter Milan
He was raised in the youth system of Inter and represented the club in the 2018–19 UEFA Youth League and 2019–20 UEFA Youth League.

Loan to Pro Sesto

On 16 September 2020, he joined Serie C club Pro Sesto on a season-long loan.

He made his professional Serie C debut for Pro Sesto on 7 October 2020 in a game against AlbinoLeffe, as a starter.

AlbinoLeffe
On 24 August 2021, Ntube joined AlbinoLeffe on a permanent deal.

International career
Born in Italy, Ntube is of Cameroonian descent. He was first called up to represent Italy in 2016 with the Under-16 squad. With the Under-17 team, he was called up to the Under-17 Euro qualifiers, but remained on the bench and was not selected for the final tournament squad. With the Under-19 team, he appeared in the Under-19 Euro qualifiers, but the final tournament was cancelled due to the COVID-19 pandemic in Europe.

References

External links
 

2001 births
Living people
Sportspeople from Ferrara
Italian footballers
Italy youth international footballers
Italian people of Cameroonian descent
Italian sportspeople of African descent
Association football defenders
S.S.D. Pro Sesto players
U.C. AlbinoLeffe players
Serie C players
Footballers from Emilia-Romagna